Five Days of Zagreb in Sarajevo is an annual cultural festival held in Sarajevo, Bosnia and Herzegovina that celebrates Croatian culture. It was established in 2009 by Association for Promotion of Culture and Art " Ja BiH.." Zagreb and  HKD Napredak. The festival hosts a five-day programme that includes numerous art exhibitions, film screenings, music concerts, art workshops and theatre productions. It is endorsed by the governments of the Federation of Bosnia and Herzegovina and the Republic of Croatia.

References

Recurring events established in 2009
May events
Tourist attractions in Sarajevo
Annual events in Bosnia and Herzegovina
Croatian culture
Festivals in Sarajevo